Benjamin Araújo (born 24 March 1900, date of death unknown) was a Portuguese wrestler. He competed in the men's Greco-Roman featherweight at the 1928 Summer Olympics.

References

External links
 

1900 births
Year of death missing
Portuguese male sport wrestlers
Olympic wrestlers of Portugal
Wrestlers at the 1928 Summer Olympics
People from Moura, Portugal
Sportspeople from Beja District